Fabia Arete was a dancer, actress and singer in Ancient Rome. 

She was a freedwoman, which was a common background for a stage performer. She is referred to as an archimima, which was the title for the leading lady actress of a Roman theatre, and as a diurna, signifying that she toured as a guest actress in different theatres and theatre companies, demonstrating that she enjoyed fame and popularity.

She is described as a famed actress and likely belonged to the elite minority of Roman actresses employed to perform speeking roles in a period when female stage artists were normally engaged only to dance or sing in the choir, and she became wealthy enough to afford a grand funeral monument for herself and her spouse. A role she is believed to have performed was the famous comedy role of the plotting wife Charition.

References 

Ancient actresses

Ancient Roman actors
Ancient Roman theatre practitioners
Ancient Roman dancers
Ancient singers
Ancient Roman slaves and freedmen